Telemus was a figure of Greek mythology, a prophet, son of Eurymus. Telemus warned the Cyclops Polyphemus that he would lose his sight to a man named Odysseus.

Note

Reference 

 Homer, The Odyssey with an English Translation by A.T. Murray, Ph.D. in two volumes. Cambridge, MA., Harvard University Press; London, William Heinemann, Ltd. 1919. . Online version at the Perseus Digital Library. Greek text available from the same website.

Mythological Greek seers